Åke Andersson (born 14 November 1936) is a former international speedway rider from Sweden. He is not to be confused with Lars-Åke Andersson, another Swedish international rider from the same time period.

Speedway career 
Andersson earned seven caps for Sweden and rode in the top tier of British Speedway in 1968, riding for Glasgow Tigers.

Between 2004 and 2006, Åke Andersson was a mechanic and advisor to Thomas H. Jonasson.

References 

1946 births
Swedish speedway riders
Glasgow Tigers riders
Living people